Saint-Marc-du-Lac-Long is a parish municipality in the Canadian province of Quebec, located in the Témiscouata Regional County Municipality. It has a total area of 60.19 square miles, with a total land area of 57.47 square miles.

Demographics 

See also
Crocs River, a stream
List of parish municipalities in Quebec

References

External links

Parish municipalities in Quebec
Incorporated places in Bas-Saint-Laurent